Louis Wacker (May 13, 1934 – February 15, 2019) was an American gridiron football player and coach. He played professionally with the Calgary Stampeders of the Western Interprovincial Football Union–a forerunner of the Canadian Football League (CFL)—in 1956. Wacker served as the head football coach at Emory and Henry College in Emory, Virginia from 1982 to 2004, compiling  a record of 164–76 and leading the Emory and Henry Wasps to 11 Old Dominion Athletic Conference titles. He was also the head men's lacrosse coach at Hampden–Sydney College in Hampden Sydney, Virginia for one season, in 1975 tallying a mark of 1–8.

Head coaching record

Football

References

1934 births
2019 deaths
American football halfbacks
American players of Canadian football
Canadian football running backs
Calgary Stampeders players
Emory and Henry Wasps football coaches
Hampden–Sydney Tigers football coaches
Hampden–Sydney Tigers men's lacrosse coaches
Richmond Spiders football players
People from Highland Springs, Virginia
Coaches of American football from Virginia
Players of American football from Virginia